Judo, for the 2019 Island Games, held at the Devils Tower Camp - Gym, Gibraltar in July 2019.

Medal table

Results

Men

Women

References

2019 Island Games
2019
Island Games